Winnie-the-Pooh (also known as Pooh Bear or simply Pooh) is a fictional anthropomorphic teddy bear created by English author A. A. Milne and English illustrator E. H. Shepard.

The first collection of stories about the character was the book Winnie-the-Pooh (1926), and this was followed by The House at Pooh Corner (1928). Milne also included a poem about the bear in the children's verse book When We Were Very Young (1924) and many more in Now We Are Six (1927). All four volumes were illustrated by E. H. Shepard.

The Pooh stories have been translated into many languages, including Alexander Lenard's Latin translation, which was first published in 1958, and, in 1960, became the only Latin book ever to have been featured on The New York Times Best Seller list.

In 1961, The Walt Disney Company licensed certain film and other rights of the Winnie-the-Pooh stories from the estate of A. A. Milne and the licensing agent Stephen Slesinger, Inc., and adapted the Pooh stories, using the unhyphenated name "Winnie the Pooh", into a series of features that would eventually become one of its most successful franchises.

In popular film adaptations, Pooh has been voiced by actors Sterling Holloway, Hal Smith, and Jim Cummings in English, and Yevgeny Leonov in Russian.

History

Origin

A. A. Milne named the character Winnie-the-Pooh after a teddy bear owned by his son, Christopher Robin Milne, on whom the character Christopher Robin was based. Shepard in turn based his illustrations of Pooh on his own son's teddy bear named Growler, instead of Christopher Robin's bear. The rest of Christopher Milne's toys – Piglet, Eeyore, Kanga, Roo, and Tigger – were incorporated into Milne's stories. Two more characters, Owl and Rabbit, were created by Milne's imagination, while Gopher was added to the Disney version. Christopher Robin's toy bear is on display at the Main Branch of the New York Public Library in New York City.

Christopher Robin Milne had named his toy bear after Winnie, a Canadian black bear he often saw at London Zoo, and Pooh, a friend's pet swan they had encountered while on holiday. His father had bought him the toy bear in 1921 from Harrods department store. The bear cub was purchased from a hunter for C$20 by Canadian Lieutenant Harry Colebourn in White River, Ontario, while en route to England during the First World War. Colebourn, a veterinary officer with the Fort Garry Horse cavalry regiment, named the bear Winnie after his adopted hometown in Winnipeg, Manitoba. Winnie was surreptitiously brought to England with her owner, and gained unofficial recognition as The Fort Garry Horse regimental mascot. Colebourn left Winnie at the London Zoo while he and his unit were in France; after the war she was officially donated to the zoo, as she had become a much-loved attraction there. Pooh the swan appears as a character in its own right in When We Were Very Young.

In the first chapter of Winnie-the-Pooh, Milne offers this explanation of why Winnie-the-Pooh is often called simply "Pooh":

American writer William Safire surmised that the Milnes' invention of the name "Winnie the Pooh" may have also been influenced by the haughty character Pooh-Bah in Gilbert and Sullivan's The Mikado (1885).

Ashdown Forest: the setting for the stories

The Winnie-the-Pooh stories are set in Ashdown Forest, East Sussex, England. The forest is an area of tranquil open heathland on the highest sandy ridges of the High Weald Area of Outstanding Natural Beauty situated 30 miles (50 km) south-east of London. In 1925 Milne, a Londoner, bought a country home a mile to the north of the forest at Cotchford Farm, near Hartfield. According to Christopher Robin Milne, while his father continued to live in London "...the four of us – he, his wife, his son and his son's nanny – would pile into a large blue, chauffeur-driven Fiat and travel down every Saturday morning and back again every Monday afternoon. And we would spend a whole glorious month there in the spring and two months in the summer." From the front lawn the family had a view across a meadow to a line of alders that fringed the River Medway, beyond which the ground rose through more trees until finally "above them, in the faraway distance, crowning the view, was a bare hilltop. In the centre of this hilltop was a clump of pines." Most of his father's visits to the forest at that time were, he noted, family expeditions on foot "to make yet another attempt to count the pine trees on Gill's Lap or to search for the marsh gentian". Christopher added that, inspired by Ashdown Forest, his father had made it "the setting for two of his books, finishing the second little over three years after his arrival".

Many locations in the stories can be associated with real places in and around the forest. As Christopher Milne wrote in his autobiography: "Pooh’s forest and Ashdown Forest are identical." For example, the fictional "Hundred Acre Wood" was in reality Five Hundred Acre Wood; Galleon's Leap was inspired by the prominent hilltop of Gill's Lap, while a clump of trees just north of Gill's Lap became Christopher Robin's The Enchanted Place, because no-one had ever been able to count whether there were 63 or 64 trees in the circle.

The landscapes depicted in E. H. Shepard's illustrations for the Winnie-the-Pooh books were directly inspired by the distinctive landscape of Ashdown Forest, with its high, open heathlands of heather, gorse, bracken and silver birch, punctuated by hilltop clumps of pine trees. Many of Shepard's illustrations can be matched to actual views, allowing for a degree of artistic licence. Shepard's sketches of pine trees and other forest scenes are held at the Victoria and Albert Museum in London.

The game of Poohsticks was originally played by Christopher Milne on the wooden footbridge, across the Millbrook, Posingford Wood, close to Cotchford Farm. It is now a tourist attraction, and it has become traditional to play the game there using sticks gathered in the nearby woodland. When the footbridge had to be replaced in 1999, the architect used as a main source drawings by Shepard in the books, which differ a little from the original structure.

First publication

 Christopher Robin's teddy bear made his character début, under the name Edward, in A. A. Milne's poem, "Teddy Bear", in the edition of 13 February 1924 of Punch (E. H. Shepard had also included a similar bear in a cartoon published in Punch the previous week), and the same poem was published in Milne's book of children's verse When We Were Very Young (6 November 1924). Winnie-the-Pooh first appeared by name on 24 December 1925, in a Christmas story commissioned and published by the London newspaper Evening News. It was illustrated by J. H. Dowd.

The first collection of Pooh stories appeared in the book Winnie-the-Pooh. The Evening News Christmas story reappeared as the first chapter of the book. At the beginning, it explained that Pooh was in fact Christopher Robin's Edward Bear, who had been renamed by the boy. He was renamed after an American black bear at London Zoo called Winnie who got her name from the fact that her owner had come from Winnipeg, Canada. The book was published in October 1926 by the publisher of Milne's earlier children's work, Methuen, in England, E. P. Dutton in the United States, and McClelland & Stewart in Canada.

Appearance
The original drawing of Pooh was based not on Christopher Robin's bear, but on Growler, the teddy bear belonging to Shepard's son Graham, according to James Campbell, husband of Shepard's great-granddaughter. When Campbell took over Shepard's estate in 2010, he discovered many drawings and unpublished writings, including early drawings of Pooh, that had not been seen in decades. Campbell said, "Both he and AA Milne realised that Christopher Robin’s bear was too gruff-looking, not very cuddly, so they decided they would have to have a different bear for the illustrations." Campbell said Shepard sent Milne a drawing of his son's bear and that Milne "said it was perfect". Campbell also said Shepard's drawings of Christopher Robin were based partly on his own son.

Character

In the Milne books, Pooh is naive and slow-witted, but he is also friendly, thoughtful, and steadfast. Although he and his friends agree that he is "a bear of very little brain", Pooh is occasionally acknowledged to have a clever idea, usually driven by common sense. These include riding in Christopher Robin's umbrella to rescue Piglet from a flood, discovering "the North Pole" by picking it up to help fish Roo out of the river, inventing the game of Poohsticks, and getting Eeyore out of the river by dropping a large rock on one side of him to wash him towards the bank.

Pooh is also a talented poet and the stories are frequently punctuated by his poems and "hums". Although he is humble about his slow-wittedness, he is comfortable with his creative gifts. When Owl's house blows down in a windstorm, trapping Pooh, Piglet and Owl inside, Pooh encourages Piglet (the only one small enough to do so) to escape and rescue them all by promising that "a respectful Pooh song" will be written about Piglet's feat. Later, Pooh muses about the creative process as he composes the song.

Pooh is very fond of food, particularly honey (which he spells "hunny"), but also condensed milk and other items. When he visits friends, his desire to be offered a snack is in conflict with the impoliteness of asking too directly. Though intent on giving Eeyore a pot of honey for his birthday, Pooh could not resist eating it on his way to deliver the present and so instead gives Eeyore "a useful pot to put things in". When he and Piglet are lost in the forest during Rabbit's attempt to "unbounce" Tigger, Pooh finds his way home by following the "call" of the honeypots from his house. Pooh makes it a habit to have "a little something" around 11:00 in the morning. As the clock in his house "stopped at five minutes to eleven some weeks ago", any time can be Pooh's snack time.

Pooh is very social. After Christopher Robin, his closest friend is Piglet, and he most often chooses to spend his time with one or both of them. But he also habitually visits the other animals, often looking for a snack or an audience for his poetry as much as for companionship. His kind-heartedness means he goes out of his way to be friendly to Eeyore, visiting him and bringing him a birthday present and building him a house, despite receiving mostly disdain from Eeyore in return. Devan Coggan of Entertainment Weekly saw a similarity between Pooh and Paddington Bear, two "extremely polite British bears without pants", adding that "both bears share a philosophy of kindness and integrity".

Posthumous sequels
An authorised sequel Return to the Hundred Acre Wood was published on 5 October 2009. The author, David Benedictus, has developed, but not changed, Milne's characterisations. The illustrations, by Mark Burgess, are in the style of Shepard.

Another authorised sequel, Winnie-the-Pooh: The Best Bear in All the World, was published by Egmont in 2016. The sequel consists of four short stories by four leading children's authors, Kate Saunders, Brian Sibley, Paul Bright, and Jeanne Willis. Illustrations are by Mark Burgess. The Best Bear in All The World sees the introduction of a new character, Penguin, which was inspired by a long-lost photograph of Milne and his son Christopher with a toy penguin.

In 2016, Winnie-the-Pooh Meets the Queen was published to mark the 90th anniversary of Milne's creation and the 90th birthday of Queen Elizabeth II. It sees Pooh meet the Queen at Buckingham Palace.

Stephen Slesinger
On 6 January 1930, Stephen Slesinger purchased US and Canadian merchandising, television, recording, and other trade rights to the Winnie-the-Pooh works from Milne for a $1,000 advance and 66% of Slesinger's income, creating the modern licensing industry. By November 1931, Pooh was a $50 million-a-year business. Slesinger marketed Pooh and his friends for more than 30 years, creating the first Pooh doll, record, board game, puzzle, US radio broadcast (on NBC), animation, and motion picture.

Red shirt Pooh
The first time Pooh and his friends appeared in colour was 1932, when he was drawn by Slesinger in his now-familiar red shirt and featured on an RCA Victor picture record. Parker Brothers introduced A. A. Milne's Winnie-the-Pooh Game in 1933, again with Pooh in his red shirt. In the 1940s, Agnes Brush created the first plush dolls with Pooh in a shirt.

Disney exclusivity (1953–2021)

After Slesinger's death in 1953, his wife, Shirley Slesinger Lasswell, continued developing the character herself. In 1961, she licensed rights to Walt Disney Productions in exchange for royalties in the first of two agreements between Stephen Slesinger, Inc., and Disney. The same year, A. A. Milne's widow, Daphne Milne, also licensed certain rights, including motion picture rights, to Disney.

Since 1966, Disney has released numerous animated productions starring its version of Winnie the Pooh and related characters, starting with the theatrical featurette Winnie the Pooh and the Honey Tree. This was followed by Winnie the Pooh and the Blustery Day (1968), and Winnie the Pooh and Tigger Too (1974). These three featurettes were combined into a feature-length movie, The Many Adventures of Winnie the Pooh, in 1977. A fourth featurette, Winnie the Pooh and a Day for Eeyore, was released in 1983.

A new series of Winnie the Pooh theatrical feature-length films launched in the 2000s, with The Tigger Movie (2000), Piglet's Big Movie (2003), Pooh's Heffalump Movie (2005), and Winnie the Pooh (2011).

Disney has also produced television series based on the franchise, including Welcome to Pooh Corner (Disney Channel, 1983–1986), The New Adventures of Winnie the Pooh (ABC, 1988–1991), The Book of Pooh (Playhouse Disney, 2001–2003), and My Friends Tigger & Pooh (Playhouse Disney, 2007–2010).

A.A. Milne's U.S. copyright in the Winnie-the-Pooh character expired at the end of 2021, as it had been 95 years since publication of the first story. The character has thus entered the public domain in the United States and Disney no longer holds exclusive rights there. Independent filmmaker Rhys Frake-Wakefield capitalized on this shortly thereafter by producing a horror film titled Winnie-the-Pooh: Blood and Honey. The UK copyright will expire on 1 January 2027, the 70th year since Milne's death.

Merchandising revenue dispute
Pooh videos, soft toys, and other merchandise generate substantial annual revenues for Disney. The size of Pooh stuffed toys ranges from Beanie and miniature to human-sized. In addition to the stylised Disney Pooh, Disney markets Classic Pooh merchandise which more closely resembles E. H. Shepard's illustrations.

In 1991, Stephen Slesinger, Inc., filed a lawsuit against Disney which alleged that Disney had breached their 1983 agreement by again failing to accurately report revenue from Winnie the Pooh sales. Under this agreement, Disney was to retain approximately 98% of gross worldwide revenues while the remaining 2% was to be paid to Slesinger. In addition, the suit alleged that Disney had failed to pay required royalties on all commercial exploitation of the product name. Though the Disney corporation was sanctioned by a judge for destroying forty boxes of evidentiary documents, the suit was later terminated by another judge when it was discovered that Slesinger's investigator had rummaged through Disney's garbage to retrieve the discarded evidence. Slesinger appealed the termination and, on 26 September 2007, a three-judge panel upheld the lawsuit dismissal.

After the Copyright Term Extension Act of 1998, Clare Milne, Christopher Robin Milne's daughter, attempted to terminate any future US copyrights for Stephen Slesinger, Inc. After a series of legal hearings, Judge Florence-Marie Cooper of the US District Court in California found in favour of Stephen Slesinger, Inc., as did the United States Court of Appeals for the Ninth Circuit. On 26 June 2006, the US Supreme Court refused to hear the case, sustaining the ruling and ensuring the defeat of the suit.

On 19 February 2007, Disney lost a court case in Los Angeles which ruled their "misguided claims" to dispute the licensing agreements with Slesinger, Inc., were unjustified, but a federal ruling of 28 September 2009, again from Judge Florence-Marie Cooper, determined that the Slesinger family had granted all trademarks and copyrights to Disney, although Disney must pay royalties for all future use of the characters. Both parties expressed satisfaction with the outcome.

Other adaptations

Theatre
 1931. Winnie-the-Pooh at the Guild Theater, Sue Hastings Marionettes
 1957. Winnie-the-Pooh, a play in three acts, dramatized by Kristin Sergel, Dramatic Publishing Company
 1964. Winnie-the-Pooh, a musical comedy in two acts, lyrics by A. A. Milne and Kristin Sergel, music by Allan Jay Friedman, book by Kristin Sergel, Dramatic Publishing Company
 1977. A Winnie-the-Pooh Christmas Tail, in which Winnie-the-Pooh and his friends help Eeyore have a very Merry Christmas (or a very happy birthday), with the book, music, and lyrics by James W. Rogers, Dramatic Publishing Company
 1986. Bother! The Brain of Pooh, Peter Dennis
 1992. Winnie-the-Pooh, small cast musical version, dramatized by le Clanché du Rand, music by Allan Jay Friedman, lyrics by A. A. Milne and Kristin Sergel, additional lyrics by le Clanché du Rand, Dramatic Publishing Company
 2021. Winnie the Pooh: The New Musical Adaptation

Audio

Selected Pooh stories read by Maurice Evans released on vinyl LP:
 1956. Winnie-the-Pooh (consisting of three tracks: "Introducing Winnie-the-Pooh and Christopher Robin"; "Pooh Goes Visiting and Gets into a Tight Place"; and "Pooh and Piglet Go Hunting and Nearly Catch a Woozle")
 More Winnie-the-Pooh (consisting of three tracks: "Eeyore Loses a Tail"; "Piglet Meets a Heffalump"; "Eeyore Has a Birthday")

In 1951, RCA Records released four stories of Winnie-the-Pooh, narrated by Jimmy Stewart and featuring the voices of Cecil Roy as Pooh, Madeleine Pierce as Piglet, Betty Jane Tyler as Kanga, Merrill Joels as Eeyore, Arnold Stang as Rabbit, Frank Milano as Owl, and Sandy Fussell as Christopher Robin.

In 1960, HMV recorded a dramatised version with songs (music by Harold Fraser-Simson) of two episodes from The House at Pooh Corner (Chapters 2 and 8), starring Ian Carmichael as Pooh, Denise Bryer as Christopher Robin (who also narrated), Hugh Lloyd as Tigger, Penny Morrell as Piglet, and Terry Norris as Eeyore. This was released on a 45 rpm EP.

In the 1970s and 1980s, Carol Channing recorded Winnie the Pooh, The House at Pooh Corner and The Winnie the Pooh Songbook, with music by Don Heckman. These were released on vinyl LP and audio cassette by Caedmon Records.

Unabridged recordings read by Peter Dennis of the four Pooh books:
 When We Were Very Young
 Winnie-the-Pooh
 Now We Are Six
 The House at Pooh Corner

In 1979, a double audio cassette set of Winnie the Pooh was produced featuring British actor Lionel Jeffries reading all of the characters in the stories. This was followed in 1981 by an audio cassette set of stories from The House at Pooh Corner also read by Lionel Jeffries.

In the 1990s, the stories were dramatised for audio by David Benedictus, with music composed, directed and played by John Gould. They were performed by a cast that included Stephen Fry as Winnie-the-Pooh, Jane Horrocks as Piglet, Geoffrey Palmer as Eeyore, Judi Dench as Kanga, Finty Williams as Roo, Robert Daws as Rabbit, Michael Williams as Owl, Steven Webb as Christopher Robin and Sandi Toksvig as Tigger.

Radio
 The BBC included readings of Winnie-the-Pooh stories in its programmes for children very soon after their first publication. One of the earliest of such readings, by "Uncle Peter" (C. E. Hodges), was an item in the programme For the Children, broadcast by stations 2LO and 5XX on 23 March 1926. Norman Shelley was the notable voice of Pooh on the BBC's Children's Hour.
 Pooh made his US radio debut on 10 November 1932, when he was broadcast to 40,000 schools by The American School of the Air, the educational division of the Columbia Broadcasting System.

Film
 2017: Goodbye Christopher Robin, a British drama film exploring the creation of Winnie-the-Pooh with Domhnall Gleeson playing A. A. Milne.
 2018: Christopher Robin, an extension of the Disney Winnie the Pooh franchise, Ewan McGregor plays Christopher Robin Milne, and filming took place at Ashdown Forest.
 2023: Winnie-the-Pooh: Blood and Honey, a horror adaptation depicting both Winnie-the-Pooh and Piglet as homicidal maniacs who go on a killing spree after Christopher Robin abandons them.
 2024: Untitled animated prequel.

Soviet adaptation

In the Soviet Union, three Winnie-the-Pooh, (transcribed in Russian as) stories were made into a celebrated trilogy.
 1969. Winnie-the-Pooh – based on chapter 1
 1971. Winnie-the-Pooh Pays a Visit – based on chapter 2
 1972. Winnie-the-Pooh and a Busy Day – based on chapters 4 and 6.

The films used Boris Zakhoder's translation of the book. Pooh was voiced by Yevgeny Leonov. Unlike in the Disney adaptations, the animators did not base their depictions of the characters on Shepard's illustrations, instead creating a different look. The Soviet adaptations made extensive use of Milne's original text and often brought out aspects of Milne's characters' personalities not used in the Disney adaptations.

Television

 1960: Shirley Temple's Storybook on NBC: Winnie-the-Pooh—a version for marionettes, designed, made, and operated by Bil and Cora Baird. Pooh was voiced by future Muppet performer Faz Fazakas.
 During the 1970s, the BBC children's television show Jackanory serialised the two books, which were read by Willie Rushton.
 2024: Untitled animated series.

Cultural legacy
One of the best known characters in British children's literature, a 2011 poll saw Winnie-the-Pooh voted onto the list of top 100 "icons of England". In 2003 the first Pooh story was ranked number 7 on the BBC's The Big Read poll. Forbes magazine ranked Pooh the most valuable fictional character in 2002, with merchandising products alone generating more than $5.9 billion that year. In 2005, Pooh generated $6 billion, a figure surpassed by only Mickey Mouse. In 2006, Pooh received a star on the Hollywood Walk of Fame, marking the 80th birthday of Milne's creation. In 2010, E. H. Shepard's original illustrations of Winnie the Pooh (and other Pooh characters) featured on a series of UK postage stamps issued by the Royal Mail.

Winnie the Pooh has inspired multiple texts to explain complex philosophical ideas. Benjamin Hoff uses Milne's characters in The Tao of Pooh and The Te of Piglet to explain Taoism. Similarly, Frederick Crews wrote essays about the Pooh books in abstruse academic jargon in The Pooh Perplex and Postmodern Pooh to satirise a range of philosophical approaches. Pooh and the Philosophers by John T. Williams uses Winnie the Pooh as a backdrop to illustrate the works of philosophers, including Descartes, Kant, Plato and Nietzsche. "Epic Pooh" is a 1978 essay by Michael Moorcock that compares much fantasy writing to A. A. Milne's, as work intended to comfort, not challenge.

In music, Kenny Loggins wrote the song "House at Pooh Corner", which was originally recorded by the Nitty Gritty Dirt Band. Loggins later rewrote the song as "Return to Pooh Corner", featuring on the album of the same name in 1991. In Italy, a pop band took their name from Winnie, and were titled Pooh. In Estonia, there is a punk/metal band called Winny Puhh. There is a street in Warsaw, Poland, named after the character, the Kubusia Puchatka Street, as he is known in Polish translations as Kubuś Puchatek. There is also a street named after him in Budapest, Hungary, the Micimackó Street.

In the "sport" of Poohsticks, competitors drop sticks into a stream from a bridge and then wait to see whose stick will cross the finish line first. Competitors hold their sticks at arms length at the same height, then drop their sticks into the water at the same time. Though it began as a game played by Pooh and his friends in the book The House at Pooh Corner and later in the films, it has crossed over into the real world: a World Championship Poohsticks race takes place in Oxfordshire each year. Ashdown Forest in south east England, where the Pooh stories are set, is a popular tourist attraction, and includes the wooden Pooh Bridge where Pooh and Piglet invented Poohsticks. The Oxford University Winnie the Pooh Society was founded by undergraduates in 1982.

From December 2017 to April 2018, the Victoria and Albert Museum in London hosted the exhibition Winnie-the-Pooh: Exploring a Classic. On exhibit were A. A. Milne's manuscript of Winnie-the-Pooh and The House at Pooh Corner (on loan from the Wren Library at Trinity College, Cambridge, Milne's alma mater to whom he had bequeathed the works), and teddy bears that had not been on display for some 40 years because they were so fragile.

In 2018, E. H. Shepard's original 1926 illustrated map of the Hundred Acre Wood, which features in the opening pages of Milne's books and also appears in the opening animation in the first Disney adaptation in 1966, sold for £430,000 ($600,000) at Sotheby's in London, setting a world record for book illustrations.

The Japanese figure skater and two-time Olympic champion Yuzuru Hanyu regards Pooh as his lucky charm. He is usually seen with a stuffed Winnie-the-Pooh during his figure skating competitions. Because of this, Hanyu's fans will throw stuffed Winnie-the-Poohs onto the ice after his performance. After one of Hanyu's performances at the 2018 Winter Olympics in Pyeongchang, one spectator remarked that "the ice turned yellow" because of all the Poohs thrown onto the ice.

Censorship in China 

In the People's Republic of China, images of Pooh were censored from social media websites in mid-2017, when Internet memes comparing Chinese Paramount Leader and General Secretary of the Communist Party Xi Jinping to (Disney's version of) Pooh became popular. The 2018 film Christopher Robin was also denied a Chinese release.

When Xi visited the Philippines, protestors posted images of Pooh on social media. Other politicians have been compared to Winnie-the-Pooh characters alongside Xi, including Barack Obama as Tigger, Carrie Lam, Rodrigo Duterte, and Peng Liyuan as Piglet, and Fernando Chui and Shinzo Abe as Eeyore.

Pooh's Chinese name has been censored from video games such as World of Warcraft, PlayerUnknown's Battlegrounds, Arena of Valor, and Devotion. Images of Pooh in Kingdom Hearts III were also blurred out on the gaming site A9VG.

Despite the ban, two Pooh-themed rides still operate in Disneyland Shanghai, and it is also legal to purchase Pooh-bear merchandise and books about Winnie the Pooh in China. In May 2021, a performer dressed up as Winnie-the-Pooh in Shanghai Disneyland was beaten by a child tourist. Mass media in China used the term “Pooh Pooh Bear” in reports about this incident because the word “Winnie” has been censored. However, search results of “Pooh Pooh Bear hurt in Shanghai Disneyland” were censored on Weibo after this incident happened.

In October 2019, Pooh was featured in the South Park episode "Band in China" because of his alleged resemblance with Xi. In the episode, Pooh is brutally killed by Randy Marsh. South Park was banned in China as a result of the episode.

References

External links

 
 
 The original bear, with A. A. and Christopher Robin Milne, at the National Portrait Gallery, London
 The real locations, from the Ashdown Forest Conservators
 Winnie-the-Pooh at the New York Public Library
 "Winnie the Pooh saga turns 100 years old", CBC News, 24 August 2014.
 "The skull of the 'real' Winnie goes on display", BBC News, 20 November 2015.

 
Anthropomorphic bears
Bears in literature
Fictional teddy bears
Fictional British people
East Sussex in fiction
Literary characters introduced in 1924
Male characters in literature
Winnie-the-Pooh characters